<noinclude>
This is a list of airlines that have an air operator's certificate issued by Benin.

References

See also
 List of airlines
 List of air carriers banned in the European Union
 List of defunct airlines of Benin

Benin

Airlines
Airlines
Benin